Interstate 510 (I-510) is a short spur route of I-10 within eastern New Orleans, Louisiana, United States. It runs south from I-10, intersects with U.S. Route 90, and ends at the Almonaster Boulevard interchange, near the NASA Michoud Assembly Facility. From this point, the highway continues south over the Gulf Intracoastal Waterway / Mississippi River Gulf Outlet on the Green Bridge.

The Interstate spur route is a portion of Paris Road, a New Orleans metropolitan area roadway stretching from the Mississippi River to Lake Pontchartrain dating back to the 19th century. The portion designated I-510 is entirely within the Ninth Ward of New Orleans, though the area the highway runs through is locally known as New Orleans East.

Route description

I-510 runs concurrently with Louisiana Highway 47 (LA 47) for its entire routing. The spur serves the NASA facility, the St. Bernard Parish seat of Chalmette (though the interstate portion ends a few miles north of the city, the highway continues as Paris Road), and the former Six Flags New Orleans.

I-510 exits are numbered from the parent route to the remote terminus, as is normal for spur interstates.

History
What would eventually become I-510 was originally proposed in 1970 as a replacement for Paris Road, but was subsequently delayed due to environmental concerns. By 1981, an environmental impact statement was completed, and construction on the spur would commence in 1985. The $87 million project saw its official ribbon-cutting on November 13, 1992. I-510 was once planned as part of a longer I-410 that would have also incorporated I-310 around the southern section of the New Orleans metropolitan area.

Exit list

References

External links

10-5
510
10-5
Transportation in New Orleans